Maud is an unincorporated community in Shelby County, in the U.S. state of Missouri.

History
A post office called Maud was established in 1880, and remained in operation until 1903. An early postmaster gave the community the name of his daughter, Maud Ridings.

References

Unincorporated communities in Shelby County, Missouri
Unincorporated communities in Missouri